Diana Thomas is an American politician and educator from Idaho. Thomas is a Republican former member of Idaho House of Representatives. Thomas is the mayor of Weiser, Idaho.

Early life 
On August 19, 1945, Thomas was born in Nampa, Idaho.

Education 
In 1966, Thomas earned a Bachelor of Arts degree in Elementary Education from College of Idaho. In 1987, Thomas earned a Master of Arts degree in Teaching Math in Elementary School from College of Idaho.

Career 
In 1971, Thomas became a teacher in Weiser School District, until 1991.

In 2001, Thomas served as county commissioner for Washington County, Idaho, until 2007.

In 2007, Clete Edmunson resigned as a member of Idaho House of Representatives to join the staff of Governor Butch Otter. Thomas was appointed by Governor Butch Otter to serve the remaining term as a Republican member of Idaho House of Representatives for District 9 seat B.

On May 27, 2008, as an incumbent, Thomas sought a seat in District 9 seat B but lost the election in the Republican Primary. Thomas was defeated by Judy Boyle with 53.4% of the votes. Thomas received 46.6% of the votes.

In 2012, Thomas became the mayor of Weiser, Idaho.

Awards 
 2018 Harold Hurst Award (June 21, 2018), presented by Association of Idaho Cites (AIC) in Boise, Idaho.

Personal life 
Thomas' husband is Mike. They have two children. They live in Weiser, Idaho.

References

External links 
 Diana Thomas at linkedin.com

Living people
Members of the Idaho House of Representatives
People from Nampa, Idaho
People from Weiser, Idaho
College of Idaho alumni
Women state legislators in Idaho
Mayors of places in Idaho
1945 births
21st-century American women